Paper Wings and Halo is the debut studio album by country/folk singer-songwriter Lori McKenna. While most of the album was recorded at Hamming Lake Studios, a couple of the tracks were recorded from live performances. It was reissued in 2002 with three bonus tracks that were recorded live at Fox Run Concerts, though it doesn't include the track "Borrow Me."

Track listing
All songs by Lori McKenna, except where noted.

 "As I Am" - 3:25 
 "What's One More Time" - 4:04
 "Paper Wings and Halo" - 4:34
 "Ruby's Shoes" - 4:23
 "Would You Love Me Then" - 4:38 
 "Hardly Speaking a Word" - 4:54
 "It's Easy When You Smile" - 3:28 
 "Paying the Price" (Bob Giroux) - 5:18
 "Swallows Me Whole" - 4:13
 "Don't Tell Her" - 5:03
 "Holy Water" - 3:24 
 "Never Be Back" - 4:29
 "Borrow Me" - 5:10

2002 re-issue bonus tracks 

 Recorded live at Fox Run Concerts

Personnel 

 Lori McKenna - lead and backing vocals, acoustic guitar, songwriter
 Megan Toohey - electric guitar, backing vocals
 Kris Delmhorst - cello, backing vocals
 Seth Connelly - producer, engineer, acoustic/electric guitars, mandolin, keyboard, bass, 
 Neale Eckstein - engineer, mixing
 Steve Friedman - engineer
 Henk Kooistra - editing, mastering
 Dana J White - mastering

References

1998 debut albums
Lori McKenna albums